A Streetcar Named Desire is an opera composed by André Previn in 1995 with a libretto by Philip Littell. It is based on the play of the same name by Tennessee Williams.

The opera received its premiere at the San Francisco Opera, September 19 – October 11, 1998. It was conducted by André Previn and directed by Colin Graham, with sets by Michael Yeargan. It quickly developed into one of the most widely played contemporary operas. The original production was released on CD and DVD.

Cast
 Blanche DuBois – Renée Fleming
 Stanley Kowalski – Rod Gilfry
 Stella Kowalski – Elizabeth Futral
 Harold "Mitch" Mitchell – Anthony Dean Griffey
 Eunice Hubbell – Judith Forst
 Steve Hubbell – Matthew Lord
 Newspaper Collector – Jeffrey Lentz
 The Mexican – Josepha Gayer
 Pablo Gonzales – Luis Oropeza
 The Doctor – Ray Reinhardt
 The Nurse – Lynne Soffer

Reception

In a review of the premiere in The New York Times, Bernard Holland observed: A Streetcar Named Desire is so operatic as a play that one wonders why more than 50 years have passed since its Broadway opening with no opera of note being made of it. ... The new setting of Tennessee Williams's play, with music by André Previn and a libretto by Philip Littell, answered a few questions and asked others.... First of all, it sings very well. Mr. Previn has a fine ear for voices. He knows how to flatter and coax it and send it gracefully from one musical episode to the next ... one had the impression that Mr. Previn had been writing for the musical theater all his life.

Regarding the music, Holland noted: There are angry clashes of harmony and key, many Straussian gestures, sweet-as-honey popular melody and the kinds of corporate noodling and mumbling among the strings native to a Ligeti or a Penderecki. Mr. Previn is not ashamed to incorporate Hollywood code words, especially the wailing thrusts of saxophone, trumpet and clarinet to introduce dissolution and lurid sex.

Holland commented on the principal singers as follows: [A]s beautifully as Renée Fleming sings and as assiduously as she pursues the part, she leaves a hole in the opera that nothing around it can fill. Ms. Fleming does everything an opera singer can do, but I am not sure that Blanche is a character that opera can ever reach. As Stanley in a baritone part, Rodney Gilfry sings strongly and summons the necessary physical menace. Elizabeth Futral made Stella a satisfying operatic character (and) Anthony Dean Griffey sang touchingly and surely in the tenor role of Mitch.

Other reviews have criticized the lengthy libretto (reportedly the Williams estate required a close following of the play), and music that does not advance the characters or action, and does not much suggest New Orleans of the 1940s. A shorter version was produced in San Francisco in 2007.

Other performances
Subsequent U.S. performances of A Streetcar Named Desire were given in New Orleans (1999–2000); San Diego (2000); Washington, D.C., Los Angeles, and Austin, Texas (2002); University of Kentucky Opera Theatre (2003), Virginia Opera and Lyric Opera of Chicago (2013), St. Louis (2014), Kentucky Opera and Cleveland (2015), Hawaii Opera Theatre (2017), and Opera Company of Middlebury (2018).

The European premiere took place at the Opéra national du Rhin, Strasbourg, France. The opera had its London premiere in June 2003 in a semi-staged version at the Barbican, with the London Symphony Orchestra conducted by Prévin. Much of the original cast reprised their roles, and Janice Watson replaced Elizabeth Futral as Stella.

Opera Ireland presented the work in November 2006 in Dublin. Theater an der Wien, Vienna, performed the opera in 2007, with a cast including Janice Watson as Blanche, Teddy Tahu Rhodes as Stanley, Mary Mills as Stella and Simon O'Neill as Mitch. The Australian premiere, directed by Bruce Beresford, was produced by Opera Australia in August 2007 with Yvonne Kenny as Blanche, Teddy Tahu Rhodes as Stanley, Antoinette Halloran as Stella, and Stuart Skelton as Mitch.

Other performances have been given at the Theater St. Gallen, Switzerland; Giessen, Germany; Turin, Italy; and Tokyo, Japan. In 2017 the first performance in any language other than the original English was given in German at Stralsund and Greifswald (Theatre of West Pomerania), conducted by Florian Csizmadia and staged by Horst Kupich.

References

Further reading
 : Movie for the stage? Zu André Previns Opern. In: Archiv für Musikwissenschaft 69/1 (2012), pp. 51–64.
 Frédéric Döhl: About the Task of Adapting a Movie Classic for the Opera Stage: On André Previn’s A Streetcar Named Desire (1998) and Brief Encounter (2009). In: Frédéric Döhl & Gregor Herzfeld (eds.): In Search of the Great American Opera: Tendenzen des amerikanischen Musiktheaters, Münster 2016, .
 Philip C. Kolin: Williams. A Streetcar Named Desire. Cambridge 2000, pp. 166–174.
 Lawrence Kramer: "The Great American Opera: Klinghoffer, Streetcar, and the Exception". In: The Opera Quarterly 23/1 (2007), .
 David McKee: A Streetcar Named Desire. André Previn. In: The Opera Quarterly 16/4 (2000), p. 718–723.
 Sam Staggs: When Blanche Met Brando. The Scandalous Story of A Streetcar Named Desire. New York 2005, pp. 304–319.

External links
 
San Diego OperaTalk! with Nick Reveles: A Streetcar Named Desire
, Lyric Opera of Chicago 2013: Renée Fleming, Susanna Phillips, Teddy Tahu Rhodes, Anthony Dean Griffey; Evan Rogister conducting

Operas by André Previn
English-language operas
1998 operas
Operas
Operas set in the United States
Operas based on plays
Opera world premieres at San Francisco Opera
Plays set in New Orleans